Crassispira coracina is a species of sea snail, a marine gastropod mollusk in the family Pseudomelatomidae.

Description
The length of the shell attains 13 mm.

Distribution
This species occurs in the Pacific Ocean from Panama to Ecuador

References

 McLean, J.H. & Poorman, R. (1971) New species of tropical Eastern Pacific Turridae. The Veliger, 14, 89–113

External links
 Biolib.cz: Crassispira coracina
  Tucker, J.K. 2004 Catalog of recent and fossil turrids (Mollusca: Gastropoda). Zootaxa 682:1–1295
 
 James H. McLean & Roy Poorman, A Revised Classification of the Family Turridae, with the Proposal of New Subfamilies, Genera, and Subgenera from the Eastern Pacific; The Veliger  vol. 14, 1971

coracina
Gastropods described in 1971